Udaipur International Cricket Stadium is a proposed cricket stadium in Udaipur, Rajasthan.

In 2013, after dispute between Rajasthan State Sports Council and Rajasthan Cricket Association over the availability of Sawai Mansingh Stadium during the Indian Premier League, the RCA decided to have plans of having their own stadium. RCA president CP Joshi puts plan that RCA will have three venues in Jaipur, Udaipur and Jodhpur for IPL matches. RCA has gained land in Udaipur with 9.67 acres from the Udaipur Improvement Trust on a 99-year lease and stadium will have a capacity of 35,000.

See also
 Maharana Bhupal Stadium
 Luv Kush Indoor Stadium
 Maharana Pratap Khel Gaon

References

Buildings and structures in Udaipur
Multi-purpose stadiums in India
Sport in Udaipur
Cricket grounds in Rajasthan
Proposed sports venues in India
Proposed stadiums
Sports venues in Udaipur
Cricket in Rajasthan